Joseph D. Kelly (c. 1887 in New York City – February 1953) was an American lawyer and politician from New York.

Early life
He was the son of Michael J. Kelly (c.1854–1926) who was Assistant Corporation Counsel of New York City for 22 years. He attended Immaculate Conception School in East 14th Street, in Manhattan.

Career 
Kelly was a member of the New York State Assembly (New York Co., 12th D.) in 1913, 1914, 1915, 1916 and 1917.

He was a member of the New York State Senate (16th D.) in 1920, elected to fill the vacancy caused by the resignation of James A. Foley.

Kelly was a justice of the New York City Court of Special Sessions from December 1923 to June 1929.

Sources
 W. A. WALLING NAMED JUSTICE BY WALKER in NYT on July 2, 1929 (subscription required)
 JOSEPH D. KELLY, 65, LAWYER, EX-JUSTICE in NYT on February 7, 1953 (subscription required)

1880s births
1953 deaths
Democratic Party New York (state) state senators
People from Manhattan
Democratic Party members of the New York State Assembly
New York (state) state court judges
20th-century American judges
20th-century American politicians